The RC Hotel Open is a tennis tournament held in Jönköping, Sweden and is played on indoor hard courts. The event was part of the ATP Challenger Tour in 2016. From 2012 to 2014 and since 2017, the tournament is part of the ITF Men's Circuit.

Past finals

Singles

Doubles

References

External links 
 Official website
 ITF search

ATP Challenger Tour
Hard court tennis tournaments
Tennis tournaments in Sweden